Goran Jovanović may refer to:

 Goran Jovanović (football coach), Serbian footballer who played in Russia, Hungary and Iceland
 Goran Jovanović (footballer, born 1977), Serbian footballer who played in Belarus and Montenegro